{{DISPLAYTITLE:C23H32O3}}
The molecular formula C23H32O3 may refer to:

 16-Dehydropregnenolone acetate
 Estradiol 3-tetrahydropyranyl ether
 Estradiol 17β-tetrahydropyranyl ether
 Estradiol pivalate
 Estradiol valerate
 Progesterone 3-acetyl enol ether
 Quinestradol
 THC-O-acetate